is a Japanese manga series written by Tsuneo Takano and illustrated by Takeshi Obata. It is loosely based on the Blue Dragon video game. The story revolves around the journey of a young man named Ral from the kingdom of Sphaelite. Ral has a symbiotic relationship with Grad, a legendary shadow with the form of a giant blue dragon. The series ran in Shueisha's Weekly Shōnen Jump from December 2006 to July 2007, with its 29 chapters collected in four tankōbon volumes. The series was licensed for English release in North America by Viz Media.

Story
In a world where demonic creatures named shadows enter our realm through their very namesakes, little is safe. However, when a young boy by the name of Ral becomes friends with the shadow inside him, he may be the last hope in saving the world. There, he has been enlisted to protect the kingdom from evil shadows that wish to destroy it. With the aid of his shadow, a large blue dragon named Grad, and his teacher, Mio, Ral can take on any challenger.

Characters

Main characters

A 15-year-old boy who shares a symbiotic relationship with a shadow named Grad. His mother died shortly after his birth. Upon his discovery, still an infant child, he began screaming at his saviors in very well constructed phrases. From there, a large shadow in the shape of a blue dragon emerged from his body. The shadow destroyed his village and burned all the mountains in sight, even melting the stone. Lord Roy, Ral's father, sealed Ral in a prison of complete darkness for 15 years because his late father told Roy that shadows cannot have a shape in complete darkness. During this time, Ral became friends with the shadow named Grad and his educator, Mio. His imprisonment was ended abruptly when the kingdom was attacked by a large number of shadow. Lord Roy gave the order to free Ral, after Mio stated he had control over his shadow. It does not take long before Ral summons Grad to the battle and easily defeats the shadow horde. Ral, like Grad, can breathe fire, form wings and claws that look identical to Grad's and use his dragon mane as a weapon. Despite his childish and immature demeanor, Ral is actually a brilliant strategist, using his high intelligence in multiple battles throughout the series.
Ral loves women and will do anything for them. His main goal is to protect all the beautiful women of the world. Ral also has a fondness for breasts, constantly trying to fondle them. Upon meeting Kafka he introduces himself as "Ral the Breast Groper". This sudden announcement of his favorite habit gets him labelled as immoral, though he truly is not. Despite his immoral habit he has a pure heart where he sees the reason men fight shadows "to protect their beloved women", and loves the vibrant beauty of the world.

The Délire Monstre; Grado is the Blue Dragon Shadow revered and feared for its Flamme Bleue. Knowing nothing of the human world, Grad entered Ral's shadow when he was still a baby, hearing how young humans made excellent hosts. This was in preparation for his quest to kill the Queen of Darkness, Bira, for trespassing onto the human realm and subjugating his fellow Shadow to her desires only, and ruining his home, Le Noir. Grad believes that humans are much smarter than shadows, so he allows Ral to make all of the decisions (except for once) while he gives Ral his flesh and blood. Once Le Noir was restored, Grad returned to his home along with Ral due to unique circumstances.

Ral's teacher, Mio, is a sexy and well-educated woman of Sphaelite. She is the one responsible convincing Ral to fight the shadows, and continues to make him focus on his goal. One motivational tactic she uses to get him to do the job initially was to offer Ral her breasts to grope ("tit for tat" is what she calls this method).

A host to a shadow of the first form. Seems she repeats everything twice. She was also sealed away like Ral and is thirteen years old. Ral accepts her immediately without seeing her shadow's powers because she looks so cute.

Aia's chameleon-like shadow partner. He can stretch his shadow up to sixty "machirs" and does not make a sound when he walks. His power allows him to hear anything within thirty machirs of his position. Aia also claims he likes it when she pulls his tongue.

Kafka of the Chain of Roses, (also known as Kafka la ), is a very chivalrous knight of Stola Castle. To defend the honor of his beloved Queen, and to stop Ral from groping her breasts, Kafka even went so far as to duel Ral.  When she announced the duel, she said the winner can do to her chest as he pleases. Later, Ral convinces him to accompany his troupe. Suffers badly when sea sick.

A Chaîne Lord Shadow; Riz is Kafka's partner shadow whom possesses amazing defensive capabilities, able to use its thorny roots to strangle its enemies. Riz eventually grew stronger after absorbing Buffle, the Water Beast. By doing so, he has the ability to create blades of water to flick at the opponent.
Sunsu
Sunsu is a local boy from the city of Lulira. His sister was lost to the shadows, and because Ganette did not try to save her, he has an immense hatred for him. After confronting and being knocked out by Ganette, he tries desperately to find a shadow. After confessing his admiration for Kafka, he is told that he cannot be his student without a shadow. Running from the building and out into the outer walls of Lulira, he proclaims for a shadow to take hold of him. He comes back the next morning with Gensui.
Gensui
Sunsu's shadow,Gensui, is a tiny bug like creature that can skip over water, and allow Sunsu to breathe under water for long periods of time as long as it stays above the surface. It got larger by eating shadows killed by Ganette, because Ral told him to become stronger. It also gained poisonous fangs from the cobra that attacked Ral along, with other powers.
Galette
A skilled yet easygoing swordsman. His two traveling companions are young women, named Leela and Senole, equipped with shadows of their own, Blatz (a bat) and Meesh (a cat). And he also seems to speak Spanish from time to time, as when he kills a shadow "Adios" and "tardes". And seems to be able to kill shadows with just his strength alone.
Gaira
Galette's shadow and one of the 5 that can exist in the friends form. Gaira is a huge white tiger who took Ganette as its host because he was the strongest swordsman, and Gaira wanted his help to defeat Bira and return to Nior. Gaira planned to eat Ganette and switch hosts if he ever became weak.
Yaya
A young emotionless girl who is under the control of Lady Bira, she was given the shadow of the phoenix at a young age, in order to have her "ripen" for Lady Bira's use, and now is used to guard the female prisoners. It turns out that she is not emotionless on her own accord, which is Cory's doing as she reverts to her true nature (a scared girl) when Cory is incapacitated or decapitated and has to relinquish emotional control of Yaya to reform himself.
Cory
Yaya's shadow and one of the five that can exist in the friends form. Cory is a huge phoenix who was place in Yaya by Lady Bira. known as the immortal one Cory can not die even while in the world of light and is powerful enough to hold back Grad (dragon) and Gaira (tiger) using its healing blood as well powerful wings. But it admitted defeat when it saw the true human heart shown by Ral in the battle of each other.

Only the queen can give birth to new shadows. Bira and her lust for beauty are the reason why the shadows entered the human world. She collects and possesses beautiful girls, sucking their soul orbs from them and turning them into cripples and invalids. The shadows in her court wish for everything from her hair to her saliva in order to become stronger. As soon as she is satisfied with how much beauty she has gained and produced a successor with her favorite male shadow she plans on annihilating all human beings. She is one of the 5 prime shadows, along with Cory, Grad and Gaira, that is, the Clear Human. Her most terrifying ability is to instantly disintegrate a shadow merely by glancing at it a technique called the eye of sorrow, but had no effect on Grad, which had fused with Ral, which proceeded to blast her back to oblivion with the powerful Flamme Bleue.
Her name may come from an African legend, where an evil queen named Bira. She used to demand the most beautiful virgin in sacrifices, which matches pretty well with the character of the manga.

Other characters

A host to a shadow of the first form. Like Ral, Malero was sealed away. After seeing a demonstration of his strength, Ral asks Malero to stay behind and protect the castle in his stead.

Malero's shadow partner. He claims he will do anything to see Opsquria killed so that he can return to Noir, the world of the shadows.

A knight and lord who is Ral's father. Roy imprisoned Ral in complete darkness to seal the shadow that slept within the boy. Lord Roy also gave the order that set Ral free. Ral attacked him immediately as Ral and Grad had decided to do upon being released.

Publication
Written by Tsuneo Takano and illustrated by Takeshi Obata, Ral Ω Grad ran in Shueisha's shōnen manga magazine Weekly Shōnen Jump from December 4, 2006, to July 9, 2007. Shueisha collected its 29 individual chapters into four tankōbon volumes, released from April 4 to November 2, 2007.

In North America, the series was licensed for English release by Viz Media. The four volumes were released from February 5, 2008, to June 2, 2009.

In Germany, Tokyopop began publication in October 2007 under the title Blue Dragon RalΩGrad, a spelling mandated by the licensing contract with Shueisha.

Volume list

Reception
In a review Dominic Nguyen wrote in Newtype USA "What readers will appreciate most about Ral Ω Grad is the supporting cast, which largely consists of attractive young girls."

Notes

References

Further reading

External links
 

2006 manga
Adventure anime and manga
Blue Dragon (franchise)
Dark fantasy anime and manga
Manga based on video games
Shueisha manga
Shōnen manga
Supernatural anime and manga
Takeshi Obata
Viz Media manga
Works based on Microsoft video games